Amata thoracica is a moth of the family Erebidae. It is found in Sri Lanka, mostly from wet zone forests.

References

Moths of Asia
Moths described in 1877